Adrian Nalaţi (born 21 May 1983) is a Romanian former professional football player who played as a midfielder for clubs such as ACF Gloria Bistrița, Arezzo, Politehnica Iași, Unirea Dej or Gloria Bistrița-Năsăud, among others.

External links
 
 

1983 births
Living people
Sportspeople from Bistrița
Romanian footballers
Association football midfielders
Liga I players
Liga II players
Liga III players
Serie C players
ACF Gloria Bistrița players
S.S. Arezzo players
A.C. Perugia Calcio players
CS Pandurii Târgu Jiu players
FC Politehnica Iași (2010) players
FC Unirea Dej players
CS Gloria Bistrița-Năsăud footballers